In enzymology, an aliphatic aldoxime dehydratase is an enzyme that catalyzes the chemical reaction

an aliphatic aldoxime  an aliphatic nitrile + H2O

This dehydratase converts an aldoxime on an aliphatic substrate to a nitrile as the product structure with water as byproduct.

This enzyme belongs to the family of lyases, specifically the "catch-all" class of lyases that do not fit into any other sub-class.  The systematic name of this enzyme class is aliphatic aldoxime hydro-lyase (aliphatic-nitrile-forming). Other names in common use include OxdA, and aliphatic aldoxime hydro-lyase.

See also

 D-amino acid oxidase, sometimes also referred to as OXDA

References

 
 
 

EC 4.99.1
Enzymes of unknown structure